Saúl Fernández García (born 9 April 1985), known simply as Saúl, is a Spanish retired footballer. A midfielder, he was comfortable on both sides of the pitch.

He amassed Segunda División totals of 140 games and 14 goals over six seasons, representing five clubs. He appeared in 35 matches in La Liga during his 11-year professional career, with Málaga, Levante and Deportivo.

Club career
Saúl was born in Oviedo, Asturias. After finishing his football grooming with Sporting de Gijón he made his professional debut in the 2005–06 season with Málaga CF's B-team, which was then in the second division. In May 2006, as the main squad's fate was already decided for the worst, he made his first two La Liga appearances, against neighbours Sevilla FC (0–2 home loss) and Cádiz CF (0–5 away defeat); incidentally, the reserves were also relegated.

Saúl then joined Levante UD for 2007–08, in another troubled campaign with the club submersed in deep financial problems and eventually dropping down to the second level. He had his breakthrough season the following year as he scored eight league goals for Valencian neighbours Elche CF, after having signed a two-year deal with the division two side the previous summer.

After his spell with Elche, Saúl did not have his contract renewed. In late July 2010, he moved to Deportivo de La Coruña.

Honours
Deportivo
Segunda División: 2011–12

References

External links

1985 births
Living people
Footballers from Oviedo
Spanish footballers
Association football midfielders
La Liga players
Segunda División players
Segunda División B players
Tercera División players
Sporting de Gijón B players
Atlético Malagueño players
Málaga CF players
Atlético Levante UD players
Levante UD footballers
Elche CF players
Deportivo de La Coruña players
SD Ponferradina players
Spain youth international footballers